Tudo may refer to:

Tudo, 11-CD box set by Marcos Valle
Tudo, album by Joyce (singer)
"Tudo", song by Bebel Gilberto
 Tudo (film), see List of Romanian films of 2016